James Stephen Peters Jr. (born June 20, 1944) is a Canadian retired ice hockey left wing who played 309 games in the National Hockey League with the Detroit Red Wings and Los Angeles Kings between 1964 and 1974. After his playing career he worked as a coach in the university level for several years. His father, Jimmy Peters Sr., also played in the NHL.

Biography
Born in Montreal, Quebec, Peters started his NHL career with the Detroit Red Wings in the 1964–65 season. He would also play for the Los Angeles Kings between 1968 and 1975, during which time he also played for several American Hockey League, Central Hockey League, and Western Hockey League teams. He would retire after the playing the 1975–76 season in the CHL with the Fort Worth Texans.

After his playing career, Peters served as head coach at Northern Arizona University, and as an assistant at Rensselaer Polytechnic Institute.

Career statistics

Regular season and playoffs

Head coaching record

References

External links

1944 births
Living people
Canadian expatriate ice hockey players in the United States
Canadian ice hockey forwards
Cincinnati Wings players
Denver Spurs (WHL) players
Detroit Red Wings players
Fort Worth Texans players
Fort Worth Wings players
Hamilton Red Wings (OHA) players
Ice hockey people from Montreal
Los Angeles Kings players
Memphis Wings players
Northern Arizona Lumberjacks men's ice hockey coaches
Oshawa Generals players
Pittsburgh Hornets players
Portland Buckaroos players
RPI Engineers men's ice hockey coaches
Seattle Totems (WHL) players
Springfield Kings players